The 2022 European Canoe Slalom Championships took place from 26 to 29 May in Liptovský Mikuláš, Slovakia under the auspices of the European Canoe Association (ECA). It was the 23rd edition of the competition. Liptovský Mikuláš hosted the event for the third time after 2007 and 2016.

A total of 10 medal events took place, 6 individual and 4 team events. The women's K1 event had two gold medalists after Eliška Mintálová and Stefanie Horn achieved the same time in the final run. This was the first time that there was a tie for any medal at the European Championships.

Almost 200 athletes from 27 countries participated in the event. Russia and Belarus were excluded from participation due to the 2022 Russian invasion of Ukraine.

Medal summary

Men

Canoe

Kayak

Women

Canoe

Kayak

Medals Table

References

External links
 European Canoe Association
 Official website

European Canoe Slalom Championships
European Canoe Slalom Championships
European Canoe Slalom Championships
European Canoe Slalom Championships